June Cochran (February 20, 1943 – May 20, 2004) was an American model and beauty queen.

Biography
Cochran was born in East Tennessee and moved to Indianapolis, Indiana after her sophomore year in high school. She won the Miss Indiana USA pageant in 1960, but was unplaced at the national competition. She was also Miss Indiana World 1962, but unplaced at Miss USA World 1962. She later was Playboy magazine's Playmate of the Month for its December 1962 issue, and Playmate of the Year for 1963. Her original pictorial was photographed by Don Bronstein. She was also a Playboy Bunny at the Chicago club.

Cochran died in Madison, Wisconsin, at the age of 61.

See also
 List of people in Playboy 1960–1969

References

External links
 
 

Miss USA 1960s delegates
1960s Playboy Playmates
Playboy Playmates of the Year
1942 births
2004 deaths
People from Indianapolis
20th-century American people